Pappala Chalapathirao (born 1 January 1946) was an Indian politician.

Life

Chalapathirao was born in a Dimili village in Rambilli mandal in Visakhapatnam district, and was a member of the 14th Lok Sabha of India. 

He represented the Anakapalli constituency of Andhra Pradesh as a member of the Telugu Desam Party.

He was elected to the assembly four times from the Yelamanchili constituency and won the general Lok Sabha election for the fifth time from the Anakapalli constituency of Andhra Pradesh as a member of the Telugu Desam Party. He never changed to any other party in his political career and he has clean image in politics.

1946 births
Living people
Telugu Desam Party politicians
India MPs 2004–2009
Lok Sabha members from Andhra Pradesh
People from Visakhapatnam district